Cuppy may refer to:

 15017 Cuppy, an asteroid
 Cuppy's Coffee, a chain of coffee shops
 DJ Cuppy (often simply Cuppy) (b. 1992), a Nigerian musician
 George Cuppy (1869-1922), an American baseball player
 Will Cuppy, an American humorist